Callispa elegans is a species of tortoise beetles (insects in the subfamily Cassidinae) found in Southern Asia.

References

External links 

 

Cassidinae
Beetles described in 1876
Insects of Asia